Terpenning–Johnson House and Cemetery is a historic home and family cemetery located at Brooker Hollow, Schoharie County, New York.  The main block was built about 1845, and is a two-story, five bay, dwelling with a -story side wing built about 1810.  Both sections have gable roofs rest on a stone foundation.  Also on the property are the contributing family cemetery with burials dated from 1812 to 1873, garage (c. 1840s), workshop (c. 1840s), and barn (1840s).

It was listed on the National Register of Historic Places in 2013.

References

Houses on the National Register of Historic Places in New York (state)
Houses completed in 1845
Buildings and structures in Schoharie County, New York
National Register of Historic Places in Schoharie County, New York